Hádoc is a documentary film festival held in Leira, Portugal. Founded in 2012, the film festival is produced by the Leira Cultural Association ecO to promote documentary cinema and create a space for debate and reflection. For celebrating the ten years of the festival, seven films were projected in the Theater Miguel Franco.

See also 

 List of Documentary Film Festivals

External links 

 ecO Associaçao
 Hádoc Official Website

References 

Film festivals in Portugal
Documentary film festivals in Portugal